Debbie Lindell is the Dresner Chair in life sciences and medicine at Technion - Israel Institute of Technology. She is known for her work on the interactions between viruses and their hosts in marine environments.

Education and career 
Lindell was born in Australia and grew up loving the ocean. Lindell earned her B.A. from Hebrew University of Jerusalem. She then worked as a technician on a project involving coral reef and fish and decided she wanted to pursue research in marine science. She went on to earn an M.S. and a Ph.D. from Hebrew University of Jerusalem, followed by postdoctoral research at Massachusetts Institute of Technology.

Research 
Lindell's early research was on the succession of phytoplankton in the Gulf of Aqaba and gene expression by the cyanobacterium Synechococcus. Her subsequent work examined the transfer of genes between phytoplankton and marine viruses, and the evolution of host-virus interactions as evident from the analysis of gene expression in bacteria infected by a virus. Her research also investigates the genetic factors leading to long-term coexistence of phytoplankton and viruses. In response to the COVID-19 disease, Lindell was part of a team who filed a patent for a reusable mask that is designed to prevent infection by viruses. As of 2022, Lindell has an h-index of 31 with over 6300 citations to her published works.

Selected publications

Awards and honors 
In 2009 Lindell received the Krill Prize for scientific excellence from the Wolf Foundation.

References

External links 

Living people
Hebrew University of Jerusalem alumni
Academic staff of Technion – Israel Institute of Technology
Women microbiologists
Australian microbiologists
Year of birth missing (living people)